Betta taeniata is a species of gourami endemic to the Southeast Asian island of Borneo, where it lives in inland waters.

Description
Betta taeniata is known to display paternal mouthbrooding. Males of the species have more vibrant coloration and broader heads than females. Males also have a darker stripe near the anal fin. The species reaches 5.5 cm (2.2 inches) in standard length.

Distribution and habitat 
Betta taeniata is native to Sarawak and Kalimantan Barat. It has also been reported from Thailand and Vietnam, although its occurrence in those countries is questionable and is likely the result of stray individuals.

It lives in wetlands and appears to be restricted to hill streams in forests.

Status
According to IUCN Red List, the species is threatened by agriculture and logging.

Common names 
The following is a list of common names for B. taeniata.

In English, it goes by:

 Borneo fighting fish

In the US, it goes by:

 Banded Fightingfish
Striped Betta
Borneo Betta

In Indonesia, it goes by:

 Emplasek
 Empala

References 

Fish of Indonesia
Fish of Malaysia
Taxa described in 1910
Betta
Endemic fauna of Borneo